Roderick Dion Walker (born February 4, 1976 in Milton, Florida) is a former professional American football player who played defensive tackle for three seasons for the Green Bay Packers.

1976 births
Living people
People from Milton, Florida
Players of American football from Florida
American football defensive tackles
Troy Trojans football players
Tennessee Titans players
Green Bay Packers players